Delia Hannah is a New Zealand actress and singer, notable for leading roles in musical theatre in Australia and New Zealand.

Awards

Mo Awards
The Australian Entertainment Mo Awards (commonly known informally as the Mo Awards), were annual Australian entertainment industry awards. They recognise achievements in live entertainment in Australia from 1975 to 2016. Delia Hannah won one award in that time.
 (wins only)
|-
| 1992
| Delia Hannah
| Female Musical Theatre Performer the Year
| 
|-

References 

Living people
21st-century New Zealand women singers
New Zealand musical theatre actresses
Year of birth missing (living people)